Meredith Frances Sooter (born January 19, 1983), known professionally as Meredith Andrews, is a contemporary Christian music artist, songwriter, and worship leader. She has won two Dove Awards.

Biography
Andrews grew up in Wilson, North Carolina, where she started singing when she was six years old. She attended Wilson Christian Academy, where she graduated. Andrews later attended college at Liberty University in Virginia. Though she was born an only child, her parents served as foster parents to many children while she was growing up, three of whom later were adopted by her parents.

In 2011, Andrews won two Dove Awards, "Worship Song of the Year" for "How Great Is the Love" from As Long As It Takes and "Praise and Worship album of the Year" for As Long As It Takes. On July 31, 2012, Andrews released a new single "Not for a Moment (After All)".

Before taking off as a solo artist, Andrews was a worship leader with Vertical Worship at Harvest Bible Chapel in Chicago. Since 2016 she and her family reside in Nashville while she released the album Deeper. Andrews married Jacob Sooter and together they have three children.

In 2021, she released Ábrenos los Cielos ("Open Up the Heavens"), her first Spanish album with participation of Lucía Parker, Seth Condrey, Blanca, and others.

Discography

 Mesmerized (2005)
 The Invitation (2008)
 As Long as It Takes (2010)
 Worth It All (2013)
 Deeper (2016)
 Receive Our King (2017)
 Ábrenos Los Cielos (2021)

Tours
Andrews toured with Pocket Full of Rocks and Todd Agnew.

References

External links

 

1983 births
Living people
21st-century American women singers
21st-century American singers
21st-century Christians
Christians from North Carolina
American performers of Christian music
American women singer-songwriters
Christians from Illinois
People from Chicago
People from Wilson, North Carolina
Performers of contemporary worship music
Word Records artists
People from Nashville, Tennessee